Apocopodon is an extinct genus of eagle ray from the Paleocene epoch of the Paleogene period. It contains a single species A. sericeus. It was originally described from the Danian-aged Marina Farinha Formation of the Paraíba Basin of Brazil. Recently, the genus was reported in Kingstree, South Carolina probably derived from the lower paleocene-aged Rhems Formation, significantly extending the geographic range of the genus.

References

Myliobatidae
Prehistoric cartilaginous fish genera